Albert Marenčin (26 July 1922 in Bystré, Vranov nad Topľou District – 9 March 2019) was a Slovak writer, poet, surrealist, essayist, screenwriter, editor, collage artist, translator and critic.

Early life 
He was a participant in the Slovak National Uprising in 1944. On 19 October 2011, he was awarded the 2011 Zora Jesenská Prize by The Slovak Association of Literary Translators.

Family
He had a son and a grandson, who are both also named Albert Marenčin. Another son of his is the photographer Martin Marenčin.

References

External links

1922 births
2019 deaths
Slovak writers
Slovak translators
Slovak poets
Slovak surrealist writers
People from Vranov nad Topľou District
20th-century translators